Laurel Foundation is a private foundation based in Pittsburgh, Pennsylvania, United States. It was established in 1951 by the late Cordelia Scaife May. 
The foundation's website lists its principal funding areas as "arts and culture, environment and conservation, vocational education, and community development/beautification".

References

 Paid for in part by the Laurel Foundation.

External links
Laurel Foundation

Foundations based in the United States
Organizations based in Pittsburgh